Sabine Karina Klimek (born 13 March 1991 in Timișoara) is a Romanian handballer.

Achievements 
Cupa României:
Finalist: 2014

References

1991 births
Living people
Sportspeople from Timișoara
Romanian female handball players
CS Minaur Baia Mare (women's handball) players
Romanian people of German descent
Banat Swabians